Anthony Scott Teague (born Edwin Ardell Teague, January 4, 1940 – June 2, 1989), also known as Scooter Teague, was an American actor and dancer.

Biography

Born to Herman Charles Teague and Oleta Jones Teague in Jacksboro, Texas, Teague graduated from North Hollywood High School, class of Summer 1958.

Teague first appeared on television on The Danny Thomas Show, Alcoa Theatre, and The Donna Reed Show. In film he appeared as "Big Deal", one of the Jets, in West Side Story (1961), as Bud Frump in How to Succeed in Business Without Really Trying (1967), and as Clarence in the Elvis Presley film The Trouble with Girls (1969).

On Broadway Teague played Jimmy Curry in the original cast of the musical 110 In The Shade, and Billy Early in No, No, Nanette. He also appeared as Zach, the audition director, in two national touring companies of A Chorus Line.

Teague died in 1989 from cancer. He had two children: a son, Christian (born 1972), and a daughter, Kendall (born 1975), as well as a brother, Charles A. Teague.

Filmography

References

External links
 
 

1940 births
1989 deaths
American male dancers
American male film actors
20th-century American male actors
People from Jacksboro, Texas
20th-century American dancers
North Hollywood High School alumni